Omerta is an album of duets by pianist Richard Beirach and saxophonist David Liebman and which was recorded in 1978 and originally released on the Japanese Trio label before being rereleased on the Danish Storyville label on CD in 1994.

Reception

The AllMusic review by Scott Yanow stated, "a set of duets that are primarily introspective and thoughtful. However, the melodies (mixing together originals and standards) are strong, Liebman's reeds (tenor, soprano and alto flute) provide some variety, and the musical communication is very tight".

Track listing 
All compositions by Richard Beirach except where noted
 "Omerta" – 7:55
 "On Green Dolphin Street" (Bronisław Kaper, Ned Washington) – 6:36
 "3rd Visit" (David Liebman) – 4:41
 "Eden" – 6:41
 "Spring Is Here" (Richard Rodgers, Lorenz Hart) – 7:12
 "Cadaqués" – 5:54    
 "To a Spirit Once Known" (Liebman) – 5:50
 "In a Sentimental Mood" (Duke Ellington, Manny Kurtz, Irving Mills) – 3:58

Personnel 
David Liebman – tenor saxophone, soprano saxophone, alto flute 
Richard Beirach – acoustic piano (tracks 1–7)

References 

 

Dave Liebman albums
Richie Beirach albums
1978 albums
Storyville Records albums
Collaborative albums